Albert Purdy (15 March 1899 – June 1991) was an English professional footballer who played as a wing half in the Football League for Charlton Athletic, Southend United and Brentford. While a player with Charlton Athletic, he doubled as the club's groundsman. After his retirement as a player, Purdy became the head groundsman at Fulham and lived in the Craven Cottage.

Personal life 
Purdy served as a private in the 1st Surrey Rifles during the First World War and saw action at High Wood on the Somme.

Career statistics

References

1899 births
English footballers
English Football League players
Brentford F.C. players
People from Edmonton, London
Association football defenders
Charlton Athletic F.C. players
Southend United F.C. players
Dartford F.C. players
Southern Football League players
Fulham F.C. non-playing staff
Tottenham Hotspur F.C. players
1991 deaths
British Army personnel of World War I
Military personnel from London
London Regiment soldiers